

Events

Pre-1600

497 BC – The first Saturnalia festival was celebrated in ancient Rome.
 546 – Siege of Rome: The Ostrogoths under king Totila plunder the city, by bribing the Byzantine garrison.
 920 – Romanos I Lekapenos is crowned co-emperor of the underage Constantine VII.
 942 – Assassination of William I of Normandy.
 1297 – King Kyawswa of Pagan is overthrown by the three Myinsaing brothers, marking the de facto end of the Pagan Kingdom.
1398 – Sultan Nasir-u Din Mehmud's armies in Delhi are defeated by Timur.
1538 – Pope Paul III excommunicates Henry VIII of England.
1583 – Cologne War: Forces under Ernest of Bavaria defeat troops under Gebhard Truchsess von Waldburg at the Siege of Godesberg.
1586 – Go-Yōzei becomes Emperor of Japan.

1601–1900
1718 – War of the Quadruple Alliance: Great Britain declares war on Spain.
1777 – American Revolution: France formally recognizes the United States.
1790 – The Aztec calendar stone is discovered at  El Zócalo, Mexico City.
1807 – Napoleonic Wars: France issues the Milan Decree, which confirms the Continental System.
1812 – War of 1812: U.S. forces attack a Lenape village in the Battle of the Mississinewa.
1819 – Simón Bolívar declares the independence of Gran Colombia in Angostura (now Ciudad Bolívar in Venezuela).
1835 – The second Great Fire of New York destroys  of New York City's Financial District.
1837 – A fire in the Winter Palace of Saint Petersburg kills 30 guards.
1862 – American Civil War: General Ulysses S. Grant issues General Order No. 11, expelling Jews from parts of Tennessee, Mississippi, and Kentucky.
1865 – First performance of the Unfinished Symphony by Franz Schubert.
1892 – First issue of Vogue is published.
1896 – Pittsburgh, Pennsylvania's Schenley Park Casino, which was the first multi-purpose arena with the technology to create an artificial ice surface in North America, is destroyed in a fire.

1901–present
1903 – The Wright brothers make the first controlled powered, heavier-than-air flight in the Wright Flyer at Kitty Hawk, North Carolina.
1907 – Ugyen Wangchuck is crowned first King of Bhutan.
1918 – Darwin Rebellion: Up to 1,000 demonstrators march on Government House in Darwin, Northern Territory, Australia.
1926 – Antanas Smetona assumes power in Lithuania as the 1926 coup d'état is successful.
1927 – Indian revolutionary Rajendra Lahiri is hanged in Gonda jail, Uttar Pradesh, India, two days before the scheduled date.
1928 – Indian revolutionaries Bhagat Singh, Sukhdev Thapar and Shivaram Rajguru assassinate British police officer James Saunders in Lahore, Punjab, to avenge the death of Lala Lajpat Rai at the hands of the police. The three were executed in 1931.
1933 – The first NFL Championship Game is played at Wrigley Field in Chicago between the New York Giants and Chicago Bears. The Bears won 23–21.
1935 – First flight of the Douglas DC-3.
1938 – Otto Hahn discovers the nuclear fission of the heavy element uranium, the scientific and technological basis of nuclear energy.
1939 – World War II: Battle of the River Plate: The Admiral Graf Spee is scuttled by Captain Hans Langsdorff outside Montevideo.
1943 – All Chinese are again permitted to become citizens of the United States upon the repeal of the Act of 1882 and the introduction of the Magnuson Act.
1944 – World War II: Battle of the Bulge: Malmedy massacre: American 285th Field Artillery Observation Battalion POWs are shot by Waffen-SS Kampfgruppe Joachim Peiper.
1945 – Kurdistan flag day, the flag of Kurdistan was raised for the first time in Mahabad in eastern Kurdistan (Iran).
1947 – First flight of the Boeing B-47 Stratojet strategic bomber.
1948 – The Finnish Security Police is established to remove communist leadership from its predecessor, the State Police.
1950 – The F-86 Sabre's first mission over Korea.
1951 – The American Civil Rights Congress delivers "We Charge Genocide" to the United Nations.
1957 – The United States successfully launches the first Atlas intercontinental ballistic missile at Cape Canaveral, Florida.
1960 – Troops loyal to Emperor Haile Selassie in Ethiopia crush the coup that began December 13, returning power to their leader upon his return from Brazil. Haile Selassie absolves his son of any guilt.
  1960   – Munich C-131 crash: Twenty passengers and crew on board as well as 32 people on the ground are killed.
1961 – Niterói circus fire: Fire breaks out during a performance by the Gran Circus Norte-Americano in the city of Niterói, Rio de Janeiro, Brazil, killing more than 500.
1967 – Harold Holt, Prime Minister of Australia, disappears while swimming near Portsea, Victoria, and is presumed drowned.
1969 – Project Blue Book: The United States Air Force closes its study of UFOs.
1970 – Polish protests: In Gdynia, soldiers fire at workers emerging from trains, killing dozens.
1973 – Thirty passengers are killed in an attack by Palestinian terrorists on Rome's Leonardo da Vinci–Fiumicino Airport.
1981 – American Brigadier General James L. Dozier is abducted by the Red Brigades in Verona, Italy.
1983 – Provisional IRA members detonate a car bomb at Harrods Department Store in London. Three police officers and three civilians are killed.
1989 – Romanian Revolution: Protests continue in Timișoara, Romania, with rioters breaking into the Romanian Communist Party's District Committee building and attempting to set it on fire.
  1989   – Fernando Collor de Mello defeats Luiz Inácio Lula da Silva in the second round of the Brazilian presidential election, becoming the first democratically elected President in almost 30 years.
  1989   – The Simpsons premieres on television with the episode "Simpsons Roasting on an Open Fire".
1997 – Aerosvit Flight 241: A Yakovlev Yak-42 crashes into the Pierian Mountains near Thessaloniki Airport in Thessaloniki, Greece, killing all 70 people on board.
2002 – Second Congo War: The Congolese parties of the Inter Congolese Dialogue sign a peace accord which makes provision for transitional governance and legislative and presidential elections within two years.
2003 – The Soham murder trial ends at the Old Bailey in London, with Ian Huntley found guilty of two counts of murder.  His girlfriend, Maxine Carr, is found guilty of perverting the course of justice.
  2003   – SpaceShipOne, piloted by Brian Binnie, makes its first powered and first supersonic flight.
  2003   – Sex work rights activists establish December 17 (or "D17") as International Day to End Violence Against Sex Workers to memorialize victims of a serial killer who targeted prostitutes, and highlight State violence against sex workers by police and others.
2005 – Anti-World Trade Organization protesters riot in Wan Chai, Hong Kong.
  2005   – Jigme Singye Wangchuck abdicates the throne as King of Bhutan.
2009 –  sinks off the coast of Lebanon, resulting in the deaths of 44 people and over 28,000 animals.
2010 – Mohamed Bouazizi sets himself on fire. This act became the catalyst for the Tunisian Revolution and the wider Arab Spring.
2014 – The United States and Cuba re-establish diplomatic relations after severing them in 1961.

Births

Pre-1600

1239 – Kujō Yoritsugu, Japanese shōgun (d. 1256)
1267 – Emperor Go-Uda of Japan (d. 1324)
1554 – Ernest of Bavaria, Roman Catholic bishop (d. 1612)
1556 – Abdul Rahim Khan-I-Khana, poet in Mughal Empire (d. 1627)

1601–1900
1616 – Roger L'Estrange, English pamphleteer and author (d. 1704)
1619 – Prince Rupert of the Rhine (d. 1682)
1632 – Anthony Wood, English historian and author (d. 1695)
1685 – Thomas Tickell, English poet (d. 1740)
1699 – Charles-Louis Mion, French composer and educator (d. 1775)
1706 – Émilie du Châtelet, French mathematician and physicist (d. 1749)
1734 – Maria I of Portugal (d. 1816)
1749 – Domenico Cimarosa, Italian composer and educator (d. 1801)
1778 – Humphry Davy, English chemist and physicist (d. 1829)
1796 – Thomas Chandler Haliburton, Canadian judge and politician (d. 1865)
1797 – Joseph Henry, American physicist and engineer (d. 1878)
1807 – John Greenleaf Whittier, American poet and activist (d. 1892)
1812 – Vilhelm Petersen, Danish painter (d. 1880)
1827 – Alexander Wassilko von Serecki, Austrian lawyer and politician (d. 1893)  
1830 – Jules de Goncourt, French author and critic (d. 1870)
1835 – Alexander Emanuel Agassiz, Swiss-American ichthyologist and engineer (d. 1910)
1840 – Nozu Michitsura, Japanese field marshal (d. 1908)
1842 – Sophus Lie, Norwegian mathematician and academic (d. 1899)
1847 – Émile Faguet, French author and critic (d. 1916)
1853 – Pierre Paul Émile Roux, French physician and immunologist, co-founded the Pasteur Institute (d. 1933)
1859 – Paul César Helleu, French painter and illustrator (d. 1927)
1866 – Kazys Grinius, Lithuanian physician and politician, third President of Lithuania (d. 1950)
1873 – Ford Madox Ford,  English novelist, poet, and critic  (d. 1939)
1874 – William Lyon Mackenzie King, Canadian economist and politician, tenth Prime Minister of Canada (d. 1950)
1881 – Aubrey Faulkner, South African-English cricketer and coach (d. 1930)
1884 – Alison Uttley, English children's book writer (d. 1976)
1887 – Josef Lada, Czech painter and illustrator (d. 1957)
1890 – Prince Joachim of Prussia (d. 1920)
1892 – Sam Barry, American basketball player and coach (d. 1950)
1893 – Charles C. Banks, English captain and pilot (d. 1971)
  1893   – Erwin Piscator, German director and producer (d. 1966)
1894 – Arthur Fiedler, American conductor (d. 1979)
  1894   – Patrick Flynn, Irish-American runner and soldier (d. 1969)
  1894   – Wim Schermerhorn, Dutch cartographer, engineer, and politician, Prime Minister of the Netherlands (d. 1977)
1895 – Gerald Patterson, Australian tennis player (d. 1967)
1898 – Loren Murchison, American sprinter (d. 1979)
1900 – Mary Cartwright, English mathematician and academic, one of the first people to analyze a dynamical system with chaos (d. 1998)

1901–present
1903 – Erskine Caldwell, American novelist and short story writer (d. 1987)
  1903   – Ray Noble, English bandleader, composer, and actor (d. 1978)
1904 – Paul Cadmus, American painter and illustrator (d. 1999)
1905 – Simo Häyhä, Finnish soldier and sniper (d. 2002)
  1905   – Mohammad Hidayatullah, 11th Chief Justice of India, and politician, sixth Vice President of India (d. 1992)
  1905   – Erico Verissimo, Brazilian author and translator (d. 1975)
1906 – Fernando Lopes-Graça, Portuguese composer and conductor (d. 1994)
  1906   – Russell C. Newhouse, American pilot and engineer (d. 1998)
1908 – Willard Libby, American chemist and academic, Nobel Prize laureate (d. 1980)
1910 – Eknath Easwaran, Indian-American educator and author (d. 1999)
  1910   – Sy Oliver, American singer-songwriter and trumpet player (d. 1988)
1912 – Edward Short, Baron Glenamara, English captain and politician, Lord President of the Council (d. 2012)
1913 – Burt Baskin, American businessman, co-founded Baskin-Robbins (d. 1967)
1914 – Mushtaq Ali, Indian cricketer (d. 2005)
  1914   – Fernando Alonso, Cuban ballet dancer, co-founded the Cuban National Ballet (d. 2013)
1916 – Penelope Fitzgerald, English author and poet (d. 2000)
1917 – Kenneth Dike, Nigerian historian, author, and academic (d. 1983)
1920 – Kenneth E. Iverson, Canadian computer scientist, developed the APL programming language (d. 2004)
1921 – Lore Berger, German-Swiss author and translator (d. 1943)
1922 – Alan Voorhees, American engineer and academic (d. 2005)
1923 – Jaroslav Pelikan, American historian and scholar (d. 2006)
1926 – Ray Jablonski, American baseball player (d. 1985)
  1926   – John Hans Krebs, American lawyer and politician (d. 2014)
  1926   – Stephen Lewis, English actor, director, screenwriter, and playwright (d. 2015)
1927 – Richard Long, American actor and director (d. 1974)
  1927   – Edward Meneeley, American painter and sculptor (d. 2012)
1928 – Marilyn Beck, American journalist (d. 2014)
  1928   – Eli Beeding, American captain and pilot (d. 2013)
  1928   – Doyle Conner, American farmer and politician, seventh Florida Commissioner of Agriculture (d. 2012)
1929 – William Safire, American journalist and author (d. 2009)
1930 – Bob Guccione, American photographer and publisher, founded Penthouse (d. 2010)
  1930   – Armin Mueller-Stahl, German actor and painter
  1930   – Dorothy Rowe, Australian psychologist and author (d. 2019)
1931 – Gerald Finnerman, American director and cinematographer (d. 2011)
  1931   – Dave Madden, Canadian-American actor (d. 2014)
  1931   – James McGaugh, American neurobiologist and psychologist
1932 – John Bond, English footballer and manager (d. 2012)
1934 – Irving Petlin, American painter and academic (d. 2018)
  1934   – Ray Wilson, English footballer and manager (d. 2018)
1935 – Brian Langford, English cricketer (d. 2013)
  1935   – Cal Ripken Sr., American baseball player, coach, and manager (d. 1999)
1936 – Pope Francis
  1936   – Tommy Steele, English singer, guitarist, and actor
1937 – Brian Hayes, Australian-English radio host
  1937   – Art Neville, American singer and keyboard player (d. 2019)
  1937   – Kerry Packer, Australian businessman, founded World Series Cricket (d. 2005)
  1937   – John Kennedy Toole,  American novelist (d. 1969)
  1937   – Calvin Waller, American general (d. 1996)
1938 – Peter Snell, New Zealand runner (d. 2019)
1939 – James Booker, American pianist (d. 1983)
  1939   – Eddie Kendricks, American R&B singer-songwriter (d. 1992)
1940 – Kåre Valebrokk, Norwegian journalist (d. 2013)
  1940   – María Elena Velasco, Mexican actress, singer, director, and screenwriter (d. 2015)
1941 – Dave Dee, English singer-songwriter and guitarist (d. 2009)
  1941   – Stan Mudenge, Zimbabwean historian and politician, Zimbabwean Minister of Foreign Affairs (d. 2012)
1942 – Muhammadu Buhari, Nigerian general and politician, seventh Head of State of the Federal Republic of Nigeria
  1942   – Paul Butterfield, American singer and harmonica player (d. 1987)
1943 – Ron Geesin, Scottish pianist and composer
1944 – Jack L. Chalker, American author and educator (d. 2005)
  1944   – Carlo M. Croce, Italian-American oncologist and academic
  1944   – Bernard Hill, English actor
1945 – Ernie Hudson, American actor
  1945   – David Mallet, British director
  1945   – Chris Matthews, American journalist and author
  1945   – Jüri Talvet, Estonian poet and critic
  1945   – Jacqueline Wilson, English author and academic
1946 – Simon Bates, English radio host
  1946   – Eugene Levy, Canadian actor, director, and screenwriter
1947 – Wes Studi, American actor and producer
1948 – Valery Belousov, Russian ice hockey player and coach (d. 2015)
  1948   – Jim Bonfanti, American rock drummer
  1948   – Kemal Kılıçdaroğlu, Turkish economist and politician
1949 – Sotiris Kaiafas, Cypriot footballer
  1949   – Paul Rodgers, English singer-songwriter and producer
1950 – Laurence F. Johnson, American educator and author
  1950   – Maurice Peoples, American sprinter and coach
1951 – Pat Hill, American football player and coach
  1951   – Ken Hitchcock, Canadian ice hockey player and coach
  1951   – Tatyana Kazankina, Russian runner
1953 – Bill Pullman, American actor
1954 – Sergejus Jovaiša, Lithuanian basketball player
1955 – Brad Davis, American basketball player, coach, and sportscaster
1956 – Peter Farrelly, American director, producer, and screenwriter
  1956   – Dominic Lawson, English journalist and author
  1956   – Totka Petrova, Bulgarian runner
1957 – Wendy Hoyte, English sprinter
  1957   – Bob Ojeda, American baseball player and coach
1958 – Mike Mills, American bass player, songwriter, and producer 
1959 – Bob Stinson, American songwriter and guitarist (d. 1995)
1961 – Mansoor al-Jamri, Bahraini journalist and author
1962 – Paul Dobson, English footballer
  1962   – Galina Malchugina, Russian sprinter
  1962   – Rocco Mediate, American golfer and journalist
1964 – Frank Musil, Czech ice hockey player and coach
  1964   – Joe Wolf, American basketball player and coach
1965 – Craig Berube, Canadian ice hockey player and coach
1966 – Tracy Byrd, American singer-songwriter and guitarist
  1966   – Kristiina Ojuland, Estonian politician, 23rd Estonian Minister of Foreign Affairs
1967 – Vincent Damphousse, Canadian ice hockey player and sportscaster
  1967   – Karsten Neitzel, German footballer and manager
1968 – Claudio Suárez, Mexican footballer
  1968   – Paul Tracy, Canadian race car driver and sportscaster
1969 – Laurie Holden, American actress and model
  1969   – Inna Lasovskaya, Russian triple jumper
  1969   – Chuck Liddell, American mixed martial artist and kick-boxer
  1969   – Mick Quinn, English singer-songwriter, guitarist and producer
1971 – Alan Khan, South African radio and TV presenter
  1971   – Antoine Rigaudeau, French basketball player
1972 – Iván Pedroso, Cuban long jumper and coach
1973 – Eddie Fisher, American drummer
  1973   – Konstadinos Gatsioudis, Greek javelin thrower
  1973   – Rian Johnson, American director, producer, and screenwriter
  1973   – Paula Radcliffe, English runner
  1973   – Hasan Vural, German-Turkish footballer
1974 – Charl Langeveldt, South African cricketer
  1974   – Sarah Paulson, American actress
  1974   – Giovanni Ribisi, American actor
1975 – Nick Dinsmore, American wrestler and trainer
  1975   – Susanthika Jayasinghe, Sri Lankan sprinter
  1975   – Milla Jovovich, Ukrainian-American actress 
1976 – Éric Bédard, Canadian speed skater and coach
  1976   – Nir Davidovich, Israeli footballer and manager
  1976   – Patrick Müller, Swiss footballer
  1976   – Andrew Simpson, English sailor (d. 2013)
  1976   – Takeo Spikes, American football player and sportscaster
1977 – Arnaud Clément, French tennis player
  1977   – Samuel Påhlsson, Swedish ice hockey player
  1977   – Katheryn Winnick, Canadian actress
  1977   – Maria Brink, American singer and songwriter
1978 – Alex Cintrón, Puerto Rican-American baseball player and sportscaster
  1978   – Manny Pacquiao, Filipino boxer and politician
  1978   – Neil Sanderson, Canadian drummer and songwriter 
  1978   – Chase Utley, American baseball player
  1978   – Riteish Deshmukh, Indian film actor, producer and architect
1979 – Matt Murley, American ice hockey player
  1979   – Paul Smith, English footballer
1980 – Ryan Hunter-Reay, American race car driver
  1980   – Alexandra Papageorgiou, Greek hammer thrower
  1980   – Eli Pariser, American activist and author
1981 – Jerry Hsu, American skateboarder and photographer
  1981   – Tim Wiese, German footballer
1982 – Josh Barfield, American baseball player
  1982   – Lorenzo Cittadini, Italian rugby player
  1982   – Craig Kielburger, Canadian activist and author
  1982   – Stéphane Lasme, Gabonese basketball player
  1982   – Ryan Moats, American football player
1983 – Erik Christensen, Canadian ice hockey player
  1983   – Haron Keitany, Kenyan runner 
  1983   – Sébastien Ogier, French race car driver
1984 – Luis Maria Alfageme, Argentinian footballer
  1984   – Julian Bennett, English footballer
  1984   – Andrew Davies, English footballer
  1984   – Mikky Ekko, American singer-songwriter and producer
  1984   – Shannon Woodward, American actress
1985 – Łukasz Broź, Polish footballer
  1985   – Craig Reid, English footballer
  1985   – Greg James, English radio presenter and comedian
1986 – Emma Bell, American actress
  1986   – Frank Winterstein, Australian-Samoan rugby league player
1987 – Maryna Arzamasova, Belorussian middle-distance runner 
  1987   – Bo Guagua, Chinese businessman
  1987   – Chelsea Manning, American soldier and intelligence analyst
1988 – Liisa Ehrberg, Estonian cyclist
  1988   – Grethe Grünberg, Estonian ice dancer
  1988   – Kris Joseph, Canadian basketball player
  1988   – David Rudisha, Kenyan runner
  1988   – Craig Sutherland, Scottish footballer
1991 – James Hurst, American football player
  1991   – Jordan Rankin, Australian rugby league player
  1991   – Atsedu Tsegay, Ethiopian runner
1992 – Quinton de Kock, South African cricketer
  1992   – Joshua Ingram, Canadian drummer and percussionist
1993 – Patricia Kú Flores, Peruvian tennis player
1994 – Lloyd Perrett, New Zealand rugby league player
  1994   – Nat Wolff, American singer-songwriter, keyboard player and actor 
1996 – Elizaveta Tuktamysheva, Russian figure skater
1997 – Naiktha Bains, British-Australian tennis player
  1997   – Shoma Uno, Japanese figure skater
1998 – Jasmine Armfield, English actress
  1998   – Martin Ødegaard, Norwegian footballer 
1999 – Mirei Sasaki, Japanese idol

Deaths

Pre-1600

 779 – Sturm, abbot of Fulda
 908 – al-Abbas ibn al-Hasan al-Jarjara'i, Abbasid vizier
   908   – Abdallah ibn al-Mu'tazz, Abbasid prince and poet, anti-caliph for one day
 942 – William I, duke of Normandy
1187 – Pope Gregory VIII (b. 1100)
1195 – Baldwin V, Count of Hainaut (b. 1150)
1273 – Rumi, Persian jurist, theologian, and poet (b. 1207)
1316 – Juan Fernández, bishop-elect of León
1419 – William Gascoigne, Chief Justice of England
1471 – Infanta Isabel, Duchess of Burgundy (b. 1397)
1559 – Irene di Spilimbergo, Italian Renaissance poet and painter (b. 1538)
1562 – Eleonora di Toledo, Grand Duchess of Tuscany (b. 1522)

1601–1900
1663 – Nzinga of Ndongo and Matamba (b. 1583)
1721 – Richard Lumley, 1st Earl of Scarbrough, English soldier and politician, Chancellor of the Duchy of Lancaster (b. 1640)
1830 – Simón Bolívar, Venezuelan general and politician, second President of Venezuela (b. 1783)
1833 – Kaspar Hauser, German feral child (b. 1812?)
1847 – Marie Louise, Duchess of Parma (b. 1791) 
1857 – Francis Beaufort, Irish hydrographer and officer in the Royal Navy (b. 1774)
1891 – José María Iglesias, Mexican politician and interim President (1876-1877) (b. 1823)

1901–present
1904 – William Shiels, Irish-Australian politician, 16th Premier of Victoria (b. 1848)
1907 – William Thomson, 1st Baron Kelvin, Irish-Scottish physicist and engineer (b. 1824)
1909 – Leopold II of Belgium (b. 1835)
1917 – Elizabeth Garrett Anderson, English physician and activist (b. 1836)
1927 – Rajendra Lahiri, Indian activist (b. 1892)
1928 – Frank Rinehart, American photographer (b. 1861)
1929 – Manuel de Oliveira Gomes da Costa, Portuguese general and politician, tenth President of Portugal (b. 1863)
1930 – Peter Warlock, Welsh composer and critic (b. 1894)
1932 – Charles Winckler, Danish discus thrower, shot putter, and tug of war competitor (b. 1867)
1933 – 13th Dalai Lama (b. 1876)
1935 – Lizette Woodworth Reese, American poet (b. 1856)
1940 – Alicia Boole Stott, Anglo-Irish mathematician and academic (b. 1860)
1942 – Allen Bathurst, Lord Apsley, English lieutenant and politician (b. 1895)
1947 – Christos Tsigiridis, Greek engineer (b. 1877)
1956 – Eddie Acuff, American actor (b. 1903)
1957 – Dorothy L. Sayers, English author, poet, and playwright (b. 1893)
1962 – Thomas Mitchell, American actor (b. 1892)
1964 – Victor Francis Hess, Austrian-American physicist and academic, Nobel Prize laureate (b. 1883)
1967 – Harold Holt, Australian lawyer and politician, 17th Prime Minister of Australia (b. 1908)
1970 – Oliver Waterman Larkin, American historian, author, and educator (b. 1896)
1978 – Don Ellis, American trumpet player, composer, and bandleader (b. 1934)
1981 – Antiochos Evangelatos, Greek composer and conductor (b. 1903)
1982 – Homer S. Ferguson, American lawyer, judge, and politician (b. 1889)
1986 – Guillermo Cano Isaza, Colombian journalist (b. 1925)
1987 – Bernardus Johannes Alfrink, Dutch cardinal (b. 1900)
  1987   – Linda Wong, American porn actress (b. 1951)
  1987   – Marguerite Yourcenar, Belgian-American author and poet (b. 1903)
1992 – Günther Anders, German journalist and philosopher (b. 1902)
  1992   – Dana Andrews, American actor (b. 1909)
1999 – Rex Allen, American singer-songwriter and actor (b. 1920)
  1999   – Grover Washington Jr., American singer-songwriter and saxophonist (b. 1943)
  1999   – C. Vann Woodward, American historian and academic (b. 1908)
2002 – K. W. Devanayagam, Sri Lankan lawyer and politician, tenth Sri Lankan Minister of Justice (b. 1910)
2003 – Otto Graham, American football player and coach (b. 1921)
2004 – Tom Wesselmann, American painter and sculptor (b. 1931)
2005 – Jack Anderson, American journalist and author (b. 1922)
  2005   – Marc Favreau, Canadian actor and poet (b. 1929)
  2005   – Haljand Udam, Estonian orientalist and academic (d. 1936)
2006 – Larry Sherry, American baseball player and coach (b. 1935)
2008 – Sammy Baugh, American football player and coach (b. 1914)
  2008   – Freddy Breck, German singer-songwriter, producer, and journalist (b. 1942)
  2008   – Dave Smith, American baseball player and coach (b. 1955)
2009 – Chris Henry, American football player (b. 1983)
  2009   – Jennifer Jones, American actress (b. 1919)
  2009   – Alaina Reed Hall, American actress (b. 1946)
2010 – Captain Beefheart, American singer-songwriter (b. 1941)
  2010   – Walt Dropo, American basketball and baseball player (b. 1923)
  2010   – Ralph Coates, English footballer (b. 1946)
2011 – Eva Ekvall, Venezuelan journalist and author, Miss Venezuela 2000 (b. 1983)
  2011   – Kim Jong-il, North Korean commander and politician, second Supreme Leader of North Korea (b. 1941)
2012 – Richard Adams, Filipino-American activist (b. 1947)
  2012   – James Gower, American priest and activist, co-founded the College of the Atlantic (b. 1922)
  2012   – Daniel Inouye, American captain and politician (b. 1924)
  2012   – Laurier LaPierre, Canadian historian, journalist, and politician (b. 1929)
  2012   – Frank Pastore, American baseball player and radio host (b. 1957)
2013 – Fred Bruemmer, Latvian-Canadian photographer (b. 1929)
  2013   – Ricardo María Carles Gordó, Spanish cardinal (b. 1926)
  2013   – Richard Heffner, American historian and television host (b. 1925)
  2013   – Tetsurō Kashibuchi, Japanese drummer, songwriter, and producer (b. 1950)
  2013   – Janet Rowley,  American geneticist and biologist (b. 1925)
  2013   – Conny van Rietschoten, Dutch sailor (b. 1926)
2014 – Dieter Grau, German-American scientist and engineer (b. 1913)
  2014   – Richard C. Hottelet, American journalist (b. 1917)
  2014   – Oleh Lysheha, Ukrainian poet and playwright (b. 1949)
  2014   – Lowell Steward, American captain (b. 1919)
  2014   – Ivan Vekić, Croatian colonel, lawyer, and politician, Croatian Minister of the Interior (b. 1938)
2015 – Hal Brown, American baseball player and manager (b. 1924)
  2015   – Osamu Hayaishi, American-Japanese biochemist and academic (b. 1920)
  2015   – Michael Wyschogrod, German-American philosopher and theologian (b. 1928)
2016 – Benjamin A. Gilman, American soldier and politician (b. 1922)
  2016   – Henry Heimlich, American doctor (b. 1920)
  2016   – Gordon Hunt, American voice director (b. 1929)
2020 – Jeremy Bullock, English actor (b. 1945)
  2020   – Allen Dines, American politician (b. 1921)

Holidays and observances
 Christian feast day:
 Daniel the Prophet
 Josep Manyanet i Vives
 Lazarus of Bethany (local commemoration in Cuba)
 O Sapientia
 Olympias the Deaconess
 Wivina
 Sturm
 December 17 (Eastern Orthodox liturgics)
 Accession Day (Bahrain)
 International Day to End Violence Against Sex Workers 
 Kurdish Flag Day (Global Kurdish population)
 National Day (Bhutan)
 Pan American Aviation Day (United States)
 Wright Brothers Day, a United States federal observance by Presidential proclamation

References

External links

 BBC: On This Day
 
 Historical Events on December 17

Days of the year
December